As of March 2017, the total length of Uzbekistan's main railway network is  ( of which is electrified). A large percentage of the system's track requires major repair. The main line is the portion of the Transcaspian Railroad that connects Tashkent with the Amu Darya. There are rail links with Kazakhstan, Kyrgyzstan (see Trans-Caspian Railway), Tajikistan, Afghanistan, and Turkmenistan. Suburban traffic only exists around Tashkent.

High speed rail
The Tashkent–Samarkand high-speed rail line; a line upgraded to high speed operation started operation in September 2011.

International links
Uzbekistan has links to Moscow, Ufa, Chelyabinsk, Novosibirsk, Saratov, Penza and Saint Petersburg (via Kazakhstan) and Kharkiv (via Kazakhstan and Russia, it was suspended since War in Donbas was begun in 2014). From Almaty connecting trains are provided to Urumchi in China. Also Tajik trains of Dushanbe-Moscow (No: 319), Moscow-Dushanbe (No: 320), Khujand-Saratov (No: 335), Khujand-Atyrau (No: 335), Saratov-Khujand (No: 336), Khujand-Moscow (No: 359), Moscow-Khujand (No: 360), Kanibadam-Bokhtar (No: 389), Bokhtar-Kanibadam (No: 389) and Atyrau-Khujand (No: 692) passes from Uzbekistan.

With only one change of trains in Moscow, passengers can travel overland from Central and Western Europe (Berlin, Cologne, Vienna, Prague, Budapest, Helsinki, etc.) to Tashkent and vice versa.

The Karshi-Termez line, which extends across the border into Afghanistan, is being electrified.

In March 2018, Uzbekistan Railways began a new service, connecting Tashkent with Balykchy.

Metro lines
The Tashkent Metro was the only such line in Central Asia., until the opening of the Almaty Metro. Last development projects are detailed in Uzbekistan Railways website.

Stats
 rail network carries about 40% of total freight volume in the country, and about 4% of the total land passenger volume. Around 2,350 km of the network is currently electrified, as of 2019.

Maps
 UN Map

References